The 2013 Bolivian special municipal elections were held on 13 January 2013 in the municipalities of Punata (in Cochabamba Department) and Bermejo (in Tarija Department. Newly elected mayors will receive their credentials from the Supreme Electoral Tribunal, after which they may be sworn in.

References

Bolivia
General
Local elections in Bolivia